Jarosław Przemysław Jach (born 17 February 1994) is a Polish professional footballer who plays as a centre back for Ekstraklasa club Zagłębie Lubin.

Club career

Early career
Although his mother Lucyna originally wanted him to be a swimmer, young Jarosław always was more of a football fan. He started his career in a local club Pogoń Pieszyce, where he played until his friend helped him earn a transfer to Lechia Dzierżoniów. With time he established himself as one of the most important figures in the club and was often chosen as captain of the team and took free kicks even though he wasn't even 20 years old.

Zagłębie Lubin
He signed with Zagłębie Lubin in 2013 and after a year of playing in the reserve team, he made his debut in Polish top division on May 27, 2014 against Podbeskidzie Bielsko-Biała, coming on as substitute for Đorđe Čotra in 74th minute of the match.

The club eventually got relegated and started the 2014–15 season in second division. Jach made 13 appearances, helping the side to promotion.

In 2015–16 season, he scored his first goal in a 2-1 win over Podbeskidzie Bielsko-Biała on 22 November 2015. He helped his team to win a bronze medal in that season.

In the 2016–17 season and the departure of Maciej Dąbrowski to Legia Warsaw, he became a regular starter for Zagłębie and proved to be a crucial part of the team's defense, which turned out to be the 5th in the league. A series of performances however, was stopped by an injury which caused him to pause for 3 months.

Crystal Palace
Jach signed for Premier League club Crystal Palace on 23 January 2018 on a three-and-a-half-year contract.

In July 2018, he joined Turkish Süper Lig side Çaykur Rizespor on loan until the end of the 2018–19 season, though this ended early, in February 2019, after he made only five league appearances for the side. Following his return from Rizespor, he joined Moldovan side Sheriff Tiraspol, again on loan. He spent the 2019–20 season back in Poland, this time on loan to Raków Częstochowa, where he played a total of 27 games.

Jach did not make an appearance for Crystal Palace until 15 September 2020, against Bournemouth in the EFL Cup. The game was drawn 0–0 and went to penalties. Jach scored his effort but Palace lost the shootout. In October he signed on loan with Fortuna Sittard until the end of the 2020–21 season. However, in January 2021, he signed on loan with Raków Częstochowa of the Polish Ekstraklasa. On 10 June 2022, Crystal Palace announced that Jach would be released at the expiry of his contract.

Return to Zagłębie
On 25 June 2022, Jach rejoined Zagłębie Lubin on a three-year contract.

Career statistics

Club

International

Honours
Zagłębie Lubin
I liga: 2014–15

Sheriff Tiraspol
Divizia Națională: 2019
Moldovan Cup: 2018–19

Raków Częstochowa
Polish Cup: 2020–21

References

External links

1994 births
Living people
People from Bielawa
Polish footballers
Poland under-21 international footballers
Poland international footballers
Association football defenders
Zagłębie Lubin players
Crystal Palace F.C. players
Çaykur Rizespor footballers
FC Sheriff Tiraspol players
Raków Częstochowa players
Ekstraklasa players
I liga players
III liga players
Süper Lig players
Moldovan Super Liga players
Eredivisie players
Polish expatriate footballers
Expatriate footballers in England
Polish expatriate sportspeople in England
Expatriate footballers in Turkey
Polish expatriate sportspeople in Turkey
Expatriate footballers in Moldova
Polish expatriate sportspeople in Moldova
Expatriate footballers in the Netherlands
Polish expatriate sportspeople in the Netherlands